Lucy Knisley (born January 11, 1985) is an American comic artist and musician. Her work is often autobiographical, and food is a common theme.

Knisley's drawn travel journal French Milk was published through Simon & Schuster in October 2008. It received positive reviews in several publications, such as USA Today and Salon.com.  Comics critic Douglas Wolk described it as "a keenly observed letter back home... the pleasure Knisley takes in food and company is infectious."

Knisley holds a BFA ('07) from The School of the Art Institute of Chicago. While there, she contributed to and edited the comics section of the school newspaper, FNews. Knisley holds an MFA ('09) from the Center for Cartoon Studies. She was awarded the 2007 Diamond in the Rough scholarship for her CCS application comic, Heart Seed Snow Circuit. She is a 2014 recipient of the Alex Awards.

Personal life
Knisley became engaged to designer John Horstman. At the time of his proposal to her, they had been separated for three years after a five year relationship. They married in September 2014.

Knisley gave birth to her first child on June 13, 2016. She refers to him as "Pal" in her writing, short for Palindrome, for privacy reasons.

Works

Biographical series
French Milk (2008, Simon & Schuster)
Relish: My Life in the Kitchen (2013, First Second)
An Age of License: A Travelogue (2014, Fantagraphics)
Displacement: A Travelogue (2015, Fantagraphics)
Something New: Tales from a Makeshift Bride (2016, First Second)
Kid Gloves: Nine Months of Careful Chaos (2019, First Second)
Go to Sleep (I Miss You): Cartoons from the Fog of New Parenthood (2020, First Second)

Baby books
You Are New (2019, Chronicle Books)

Peapod Farms (series)
Stepping Stones (2020, Random House Graphic)
Apple Crush (2022, Random House Graphic)

Anthology contributor
Trubble Club Vol. 1-4 (2008–09)
You Ain't No Dancer #3 (2008, New Reliable Press)
Secrets & Lies (2008, Magic Inkwell Press)
Elephano the Magician (2008)
Side B: The Music Lover's Graphic Novel (2009, Poseur Ink)
I Saw You... (2009, Random House)
Marvel Comics:
Girl Comics Vol.2 #1 (May 2010) "Shop Doc"
I Am An Avenger Vol.1 #4 (February 2011) "Growing Pains"

Self-published
 Heart Seed Snow Circuit (2007)
 Searching For Cassady (2007)
 Radiator Days (2008)
 Pretty Little Book (2009)
 Drawn To You (with Erika Moen, 2009)
 Make Yourself Happy (2010)
 Mini-comics
 Letters from the Bottom of the Sea (with Hope Larson, 2005)
 My Addiction (2006)
 French Milk minis (2009)
 The Fast (2009)
 "Paris Journal" (2009)
 "Salvaged Parts" (2010)

Albums
 Sweet Violet (2006)
 Pretty/Nerdy (2007)
 Comics Tunes By and For Us Comics Goons (compilation, 2007)

Illustrations
 Beautiful Cadavers by Liam Jennings (Cover art, 2010)
 Margaret And The Moon: How Margaret Hamilton Saved the First Lunar Landing by Dean Robbins (Illustrations, 2017, Knopf Books for Young Readers)
 Love, Penelope: Letters from a big sister who knows about life by Joanne Rocklin (illustrations, 2018, Amulet Books)

References

External links
 Lucy Knisley's website
 Lucy Knisley's blog
 Lucy Knisley's Instagram

1985 births
American women cartoonists
American female comics artists
American comics writers
Living people
School of the Art Institute of Chicago alumni
Female comics writers
Artists from New York City
Writers from New York City
American cartoonists
21st-century American women